The Bear Lake Stake Tabernacle, situated on main street in Paris, Idaho, is a Romanesque red sandstone meetinghouse of the Church of Jesus Christ of Latter-day Saints designed by Joseph Don Carlos Young, the son of Brigham Young built between 1884 and 1889. The tabernacle was built by Mormon pioneers of Bear Lake Valley who used horse and ox teams to haul rock quarried from Indian Creek Canyon nearly 18 miles away.  After the completion of the Logan Utah Temple in 1884, the workers began construction of the tabernacle.  It cost $50,000 ($ in  dollars) to build and seats around 2000 people.

The tabernacle was dedicated September 15, 1889 by LDS Church president Wilford Woodruff.  It was planned to be dedicated in 1888, but a fire partially destroyed the interior, and it had to be restored.  In 1972 the tabernacle was added to the National Register of Historic Places.  The tabernacle was refurbished in 2004-2005 and continues to operate as a meeting place for the Bear Lake Stake congregations and community.

See also
LDS Stake Office Building, also in Paris, Idaho and also NRHP-listed

References

Churches completed in 1889
19th-century Latter Day Saint church buildings
Buildings and structures in Bear Lake County, Idaho
Churches on the National Register of Historic Places in Idaho
Romanesque Revival architecture in Idaho
Tabernacles (LDS Church)
National Register of Historic Places in Bear Lake County, Idaho